Miami Film Festival may refer to: 
Miami International Film Festival, founded in 1983
Miami Short Film Festival, founded in 2002